Biduiyeh-ye Nakhai (also Romanized as Bīdū’īyeh-ye Nakhaʿī; also known as Bīdū’īyeh) is a village in Heruz Rural District, Kuhsaran District, Ravar County, Kerman Province, Iran. At the 2006 census, its population was 69, in 20 families.

References 

Populated places in Ravar County